Jyotsna Charandas Mahant is an Indian politician. She was elected to the Lok Sabha, lower house of the Parliament of India from Korba, Chhattisgarh in the 2019 Indian general election as member of the Indian National Congress.

References

External links
 Official biographical sketch in Parliament of India website

India MPs 2019–present
Lok Sabha members from Chhattisgarh
Living people
Indian National Congress politicians from Chhattisgarh
1953 births
People from Korba, Chhattisgarh
Women in Chhattisgarh politics
Women members of the Lok Sabha
21st-century Indian women politicians